Bankole Awoonor-Renner (1898 – 27 May 1970) was a Ghanaian politician, journalist, anti-colonialist and Pan-Africanist. Considered to be the first Black African to study in the Soviet Union, Awoonor-Renner was also the first African to be accredited to the Institute of Journalists in London. A convert to Islam in 1942, he won a seat on the Accra city council. Initially a colleague of Kwame Nkrumah, he helped Ghana's first president found the Convention People's Party (CPP), but later broke with Nkrumah and established the Moslem Association Party. Following the prohibition of political pluralism in the 1960s, Awoonor-Renner retired from politics, dying in poverty.

References

1898 births
1970 deaths
Ghanaian journalists
Pan-Africanism in Ghana